Le Sueur is a city in Le Sueur County in the U.S. state of Minnesota, between Mankato and the Twin Cities. It lies along the Minnesota River and U.S. Highway 169. Le Sueur was named in honor of the French explorer Pierre-Charles Le Sueur.  The population was 4,213 at the 2020 census.

The community is known locally as the "Valley of the Jolly Green Giant". A large billboard, with the caption "Welcome to the Valley" and Green Giant logo, remains even after the company and Green Giant label were bought by Pillsbury in 1979. Pillsbury merged with General Mills in 2001. In 2016, General Mills spun off Green Giant to B&G Foods and the canning is done in Montgomery, Minnesota. The old canning processing plant in Le Sueur was used until 1995. It is still used for Ag related research for corn varieties. Peas are no longer researched at the Le Sueur plant. The sugar snap pea variety was developed by a scientist at the Le Sueur plant.

History

Le Sueur was named its current name in 1853 by the community there at the time after the explorer Pierre-Charles Le Sueur who explored this area from 1683 to 1722. Before this, the area was known by the French as Prairie La Fleche, or "prairie the arrow". It is believed this place name originates from a translation of the native Dakota name for the area, Wahinoge, or "flint quarry", a material used to make arrowheads.

In 1852, the first claim on the area that is now the city of Le Sueur was made by George W. Thompson. Soon after Thompson settled here, Henry McLean, presenting a license from the governor for him to operate with natives of the area, demanded Thompson's vacation. Despite his vacation, Thompson was able to claim lands one mile upriver. Within that year, Thompson, accompanied by a party led by J.M. Farmer, founded the village of Le Sueur.
McLean, accompanied by John Christy and John Catheart and unaware of the village upriver, attempted to found his own village of Le Sueur. However, as an identically named settlement had already been legally platted upriver, McLean was required to settle for the name Le Sueur City. Rivalry over the righteous claim of Le Sueur caused both cities to legislate civil matters separately and deterred the incorporation of either community. However, in 1867, a special act by Minnesota Legislature was able to remedy this by uniting both communities into one
borough town, Le Sueur.

William Worrall Mayo was an early resident who began his practice in Le Sueur. He eventually founded the world-famous Mayo Clinic in Rochester, Minnesota, with his sons William and Charles. His old home, the Dr. William W. Mayo House, was restored to its mid-1800 appearance and turned into a museum; it, along with several other buildings in Le Sueur, is listed on the National Register of Historic Places.

The company, now known as Green Giant, was founded in 1903 as The Minnesota Valley Canning Company by 14 Le Sueur local merchants.
In 1925, along with the introduction of "Green Giant Great Big Tender Peas", a company mascot based on Paul Bunyan was introduced called "The Jolly Green Giant". The new mascot spurred the company to change its name to "Green Giant Co." in 1950.
The canning company flourished in Le Sueur until Pillsbury's purchase of Green Giant 1979 which moved Green Giant headquarters from Le Sueur to Minneapolis. In January 1995, Pillsbury officially announced the closure of the entirety of the original Green Giant processing plant, with the exception of a Green Giant research center. Of note, the more-than-55-foot fiberglass Jolly Green Giant statue resides not Le Sueur but 60 miles away in Blue Earth, Minnesota.

Geography
A small part of the city extends into Sibley County.

U.S. Highway 169, Minnesota State Highway 93, and County Highway 22 (Formerly Minnesota State Highway 112) are three of the main routes in the community.

Demographics

2010 census
As of the census of 2010, there were 4,058 people, 1,640 households, and 1,058 families residing in the city. The racial makeup of the city was 90.6% White, 0.8% African American, 0.3% Native American, 0.8% Asian, 5.9% from other races, and 1.5% from two or more races. Hispanic or Latino of any race were 11.9% of the population.

There were 1,640 households, of which 32.7% had children under the age of 18 living with them, 48.5% were married couples living together, 11.6% had a female householder with no husband present, 4.5% had a male householder with no wife present, and 35.5% were non-families. 29.3% of all households were made up of individuals, and 12.4% had someone living alone who was 65 years of age or older. The average household size was 2.41 and the average family size was 2.97.

The median age in the city was 37.9 years. 25% of residents were under the age of 18; 8.2% were between the ages of 18 and 24; 25.8% were from 25 to 44; 24.2% were from 45 to 64; and 16.6% were 65 years of age or older. The gender makeup of the city was 48.4% male and 51.6% female.

2000 census
As of the census of 2000, there were 3,922 people, 1,545 households, and 1,025 families residing in the city. The racial makeup of the city was 92.48% White, 0.25% African American, 0.15% Native American, 0.28% Asian, 0.08% Pacific Islander, 5.86% from other races, and 0.89% from two or more races. Hispanic or Latino of any race were 9.64% of the population.

There were 1,545 households, out of which 33.3% had children under the age of 18 living with them, 53.3% were married couples living together, 9.4% had a female householder with no husband present, and 33.6% were non-families. 29.3% of all households were made up of individuals, and 14.6% had someone living alone who was 65 years of age or older. The average household size was 2.48 and the average family size was 3.07.

In the city, the population was spread out, with 27.8% under the age of 18, 7.8% from 18 to 24, 26.7% from 25 to 44, 20.5% from 45 to 64, and 17.2% who were 65 years of age or older. The median age was 37 years. For every 100 females, there were 93.5 males. For every 100 females age 18 and over, there were 88.2 males.

The median income for a household in the city was $42,372, and the median income for a family was $53,362. Males had a median income of $35,810 versus $24,359 for females. The per capita income for the city was $21,605. About 5.8% of families and 8.8% of the population were below the poverty line, including 12.3% of those under age 18 and 10.7% of those age 65 or over.

Economy
Despite the devastation of Green Giant's departure, unemployment is low due to expansions to the pre-existing Le Sueur Inc. foundry and Davisco creamery and Cambria, a manufacturer of natural quartz surfaces. A Mars pet food plant existed in Le Sueur shortly until it was closed in 2009.

Education
The school system of Le Sueur, Le Sueur-Henderson School District, services the 1,076 students of Le Sueur and the nearby city of Henderson jointly. This system consists of Park Elementary School and Le Sueur-Henderson Secondary School in Le Sueur and Hilltop Elementary School in Henderson. Each school in the system services its own division of the system from Kindergarten to 12th grade. Park Elementary School serves Kindergarten-3rd grade; Hilltop serves 4th-5th grade; Le Sueur-Henderson Secondary School serves 6th-12th grade.

Beyond the public school system, the St. Anne's Catholic School, a private Catholic elementary school, serves students from pre-kindergarten to 5th grade. Despite being a Catholic institution, St. Anne's admits students from all Christian denominations.

Places of worship

The City of Le Sueur holds six churches total with a Catholic church, a Methodist church, an Evangelical church, and three Lutheran churches.

On July 26, 1862, the Saint Anne's Roman Catholic parish was established by the Roman Catholic Archdiocese of Saint Paul and Minneapolis with Father Venn as its first pastor. And within a year, a church was built. the church was affiliated, as of its original founding, with Le Sueur's french populace.

The Zion United Church of Christ, the first Lutheran church of Le Sueur still in existence today, was formed from the two churches present in the Le Sueur area at the year of 1868, A German native Lutheran church and a New Knoxville, Ohio native Reform church. The church moved to three different parts of Le Sueur until being plotted in its current location in 1956. Until a 1931 vote changed it to English, church services were held in German.

A few years after the Zion church's merger, a wave of Swedish immigration spurred the formation of the First Lutheran Church, in 1883. The church moved to three different parts of Le Sueur until being plotted in its current location in 1980. Church services were held in Swedish until 1927 when they were changed to English.

In 1955, the Grace Lutheran Church was founded as a member of the Wisconsin Evangelical Lutheran Synod.

In 1978, the Word of Life Lutheran Brethren Church was formed by a group of Le Sueur Lutheran families. The church existed only among church members' houses until a church building was purchased, the First Lutheran Church's previous building, in 1980. The church was plotted in its current location in 1996.

Le Sueur also holds the Le Sueur United Methodist Church.

References

Further reading
 City of Le Sueur Official Website
 Le Sueur Area Chamber of Commerce

Cities in Le Sueur County, Minnesota
Cities in Sibley County, Minnesota
Cities in Minnesota
1853 establishments in Minnesota Territory
Populated places established in 1853